This railway station is reconstructed and completed in January 2023
Shaktinagar Terminal railway station is a small railway station in Sonbhadra, Uttar Pradesh. Its code is SKTN. It serves the town of Shaktinagar, but the station consists of only one platform and lacks facilities including running water, sanitation and shelter. The station is connected to major cities such as Chopan, Robertsganj, Mirzapur, Allahabad, Rae Bareli, Lucknow, Bareilly, Pilibhit, Tanakpur and Varanasi.

Trains 

Some of the trains that run from Shaktinagar Terminal are :

 Shaktinagar Terminal–Bareilly Triveni Express
 Varanasi–Shaktinagar Terminal Intercity Express
 Chopan–Shaktinagar Terminal Passenger

References

Railway stations in Sonbhadra district
Dhanbad railway division